Achaea mormoides is a species of moth of the family Erebidae.

Distribution
It is found in Africa, including Angola, Nigeria, Ghana, Congo, Sierra Leone, South Africa, and Zambia.

References

External links

Achaea (moth)
Moths described in 1858
Erebid moths of Africa